Karatara is a town in Knysna Local Municipality in the Western Cape province of South Africa.

Settlement and forestry station on the Karatara River which flows southwards into Swartvlei. It is situated 5 km west of Barrington and some 40 km northwest of Knysna. It was founded in 1941. The name is of Khoekhoen origin and probably means 'horse hill', after a hillock to the north. Previously the Karatara River was known as the Tsao or Witterivier.

References

Populated places in the Knysna Local Municipality